Gang Busters was an American radio series.

Gangbuster(s) or Gang Busters might also refer to:

 Gang Busters (serial), a movie serial based on the radio series
 Gang Busters, a 1955 crime film
 "Gang Busters" (Tiny Toons episode), a Tiny Toon episode
 Gangbuster (DC Comics), a DC Comics character
 Gangbuster (film), a 1977 crime film 
 Gangbusters (role-playing game), a role-playing game
 Gangbusters (video game), a 1982 Commodore 64 strategy game